In the computer science fields of knowledge engineering and ontology, the Sigma knowledge engineering environment is an open source computer program for the development of formal  ontologies. It is designed for use with the Suggested Upper Merged Ontology. It originally included only the Vampire theorem prover as its core deductive inference engine, but now allows use of many other provers that have participated in the CASC/CADE competitions.

References

External links 
Sigma web site
 TPTP/CADE

Ontology (information science)